C14orf180 is found on chromosome 14 in humans: 14q32.33. It consists of 1832 bp and 160 amino acids post translation. There is a total number of 6 exons. C14orf180 is also known as NRAC, C14orf77, and Chromosome 14 Open Reading Frame 180.

Isoforms 
C14orf180 has two known isoforms.

Protein

General properties 
C14orf180 protein consists of 160 amino acids. C14orf180 has a predicted molecular weight of 18.1 kD. It also has a predicted unmodified isoelectric point of 11 pI.

Secondary Sequence 
The predicted secondary structure was determined by a cross- program analysis. The results showed three alpha-helices and two-beta sheets. Which, was also predicted in some mammals.

Regulation

Gene level regulation 
Overall, C14orf180 is moderately expressed in adipose tissue, hear tissue, and skeletal muscle.  Slight expression is seen in a wide range of tissues as well. In fetal development expression is highest in the heart tissue through 11-20 weeks, with a peak at 18 weeks.

Homology

Paralogs 
There are no known paralogs of the C14orf180 gene.

Orthologs 
The C14orf180 gene is found in jawed vertebrates, and is highly conserved in mammals. Some examples are listed below.

Function 
The C14orf180 is predicted to be involved in low- density lipoprotein particle protein clearance; however, the function is yet to be well understood by the scientific community.

Clinical significance 
The clinical significance of the C14orf180 gene is yet to be well understood by the scientific community. However, the expression of C14orf180 in skeletal muscle was studied in young males or females compared to old male or females and no significant change was found. C14orf180 was studied in children with obesity, no change expression was found compared to children without obesity.

References